Brayden Crossley (born 16 August 1999) is a former professional Australian rules footballer who played for the Gold Coast Football Club in the Australian Football League (AFL).

Early life
Crossley was born and raised on the Gold Coast. His father, Troy, is a Southport Sharks dual premiership player and Hall of Fame inductee. Brayden grew up playing his junior football for the Burleigh Bombers before switching to Palm Beach Currumbin in the latter stages of his junior football. He attended Palm Beach Currumbin High School throughout his youth and joined Gold Coast Suns' academy in his teenage years. In October 2016, Crossley played a starring role for his high school when he led them to victory in the Queensland Schools Cup grand final and was subsequently named best on ground for his three-goal performance.

In his final year of junior football, Crossley was selected to represent the Gold Coast in the Academy Series and the Allies in the 2017 AFL Under 18 Championships. He was subsequently named the Allies' MVP and the All-Australian ruckman. In November 2017, he was drafted by the Gold Coast Football Club with pick 52 in the 2017 AFL draft.

AFL career
Crossley made his AFL debut in round 7 of the 2018 AFL season against the Western Bulldogs. He kicked a goal on debut and recorded thirteen disposals, seven hit outs and five tackles.

On 25 May 2019, Crossley tested positive to cocaine by ASADA on a match day ahead of a NEAFL game between Gold Coast Suns and the Sydney Swans, in which he played in a kicked two goals.

On 8 August, the news broke and Crossley now faces a ban of up to four-years under the Australian Football Anti-Doping Code.

References

External links

 

1999 births
Living people
Gold Coast Football Club players
Southport Australian Football Club players
Australian rules footballers from Queensland
Sportspeople from the Gold Coast, Queensland